The Bishop of Wolverhampton is an episcopal title used by a suffragan bishop of the Church of England Diocese of Lichfield, in the Province of Canterbury, England. The title takes its name after the city of Wolverhampton in the West Midlands; the See was erected under the Suffragans Nomination Act 1888 by Order in Council dated 6 February 1979. The Bishop of Wolverhampton has particular episcopal oversight of the parishes in the Archdeaconries of Lichfield and Walsall. The bishops suffragan of Wolverhampton have been area bishops since the Lichfield area scheme was erected in 1992.

List of bishops

References

External links
 Crockford's Clerical Directory - Listings

Bishops of Wolverhampton
Anglican suffragan bishops in the Diocese of Lichfield